The 1928 Illinois gubernatorial election was held on November 6, 1928. Incumbent two-term Republican Governor Len Small was defeated in the Republican primary. Republican nominee Louis Lincoln Emmerson defeated Democratic nominee Floyd E. Thompson with 56.76% of the vote.

Primary elections
Primary elections were held on April 10, 1928.

Democratic primary

Candidates
Floyd E. Thompson, justice of the Supreme Court of Illinois

Results

Republican primary

Candidates
Louis Lincoln Emmerson, incumbent Secretary of State of Illinois
Len Small, incumbent Governor

Results

Independent Republican primary

Candidates
Louis Lincoln Emmerson, incumbent Secretary of State of Illinois
Len Small, incumbent Governor

Results

General election

Major candidates
Floyd E. Thompson, Democratic
Louis Lincoln Emmerson, Republican

Minor candidates
George Koop, Socialist, nominee for U.S. Senate in 1924
J. E. Procum, Socialist Labor, nominee for U.S. House in 1924 in the at-large district
William F. Kruse, Workers Party of America, Party District Organizer for the Chicago district

Results

See also
1928 Illinois lieutenant gubernatorial election

References

Bibliography
 

1928
Illinois
Gubernatorial
November 1928 events in the United States